Christina Thorholm (born 11 August 1964) is a Danish politician, who is a member of the Folketing for the Social Liberal Party. She entered parliament on 31 August 2021 as a replacement for Kristian Hegaard after he resigned his seat.

Political career
Thorholm has been a member of the municipal council of Hillerød Municipality since 2009. She ran in the 2019 Danish general election, where she received 1,524 votes. This was not enough for a seat in parliament, but she became the Social Liberal Party's primary substitute in the North Zealand constituency. Kristian Hegaard resigned his seat on 31 August 2021, following self-admitted offensive behavior while drunk at a party, and Thorholm took over his seat in parliament.

References

External links 
 Biography on the website of the Danish Parliament (Folketinget)

1964 births
Living people
Danish Social Liberal Party politicians
21st-century Danish women politicians
Danish municipal councillors
Women members of the Folketing
Members of the Folketing 2019–2022